Samartín de Podes is one of thirteen parishes (administrative divisions) in the Gozón municipality, within the province and autonomous community of Asturias, in northern Spain.

Population entities 
 El Campo
 La Xenra
 La Granda
 Lloreda
 Montoril

Other minor locations:
Armayor, La Cai, El Caleyón, La Campa, Carbayal, El Carbeyu, El Cellero, Cirvión, La Corona, La Cuesta, Fresno, La Furcada, La Guarida, Güía, L'Otero, La Pasada, El Puirtu, La Raba, El Regarín, La Reguera, El Teleférico, La Torre, Los Valles, Valpire, La Varota and Xagón.

References 

Parishes in Gozón